World Damba Festival is an enactment of the Damba festival of Northern Ghana by Ghanaians living in other parts of the world.  World Damba festival was first celebrated in 1999 in Louisville, Kentucky. London hosted the event in 2012. Other cities that have hosted the festival include Boston in Massachusetts, Amsterdam, and Brussels.

References

Festivals in Ghana
Dagbon